Gerald Rex Parsons (26 January 1934 – 5 February 2023) was an English cricketer. He was a right-handed batsman and right-arm off-break bowler who played for Cornwall.

Parsons, who played Minor Counties cricket for Cornwall from 1966–1973, made his only List A appearance during the 1970 Gillette Cup, against Glamorgan. Opening the batting and captaining the side, he made six runs before being bowled by Malcolm Nash. He had succeeded Robin Harvey as Cornwall captain in 1970. 

Parsons died at the West Heanton Residential Home in Beaworthy, Devon on 5 February 2023, at the age of 89.

References

External links
 

1934 births
2023 deaths
People from Okehampton
English cricketers
Cornwall cricketers
Cornwall cricket captains
Devon cricketers